The Jewish Educational Center is an eighty-year-old yeshiva school located in Elizabeth, in Union County, New Jersey, United States, serving students in Pre-Kindergarten through twelfth grades. Throughout the day the student curriculum consists of Judaic and secular studies. JEC, as it is commonly known, is run by its dean, Rabbi Elazar Mayer Teitz. The school has been accredited by the Middle States Association of Colleges and Schools Commission on Secondary Schools since 2008 and is accredited until January 2024. The Jewish Educational Center also includes the Jewish communities of Elizabeth and Hillside, including five synagogues, a mikveh and a cemetery.

The school includes three divisions:
JEC Lower School: Pre-Kindergarten to 5th grade for boys, Pre-Kindergarten to 6th grade for girls, founded in 1939.
Rav Teitz Mesivta Academy (RTMA) : 6th to 12th grade for boys, founded in 1955.
Bruriah High School for Girls: 7th to 12th grade for girls, founded in 1963.

As of the 2013-14 school year, the Yeshiva of Elizabeth (now JEC Lower School) had an enrollment of 205 students (plus 74 in pre-K) and 31.8 classroom teachers (on an FTE basis), for a student–teacher ratio of 6.4:1. The Rav Teitz Mesivta Academy had an enrollment of 190 students and 21.0 classroom teachers (on an FTE basis), for a ratio of 9.0:1. The Bruriah High School for Girls had an enrollment of 377 students and 23.0 classroom teachers (on an FTE basis), for a ratio of 16.4:1.

Advanced Placement (AP) courses offered are: AP Chemistry, AP Physics B, AP Physics C, AP Calculus AB and BC, AP Computers A and AB, AP United States History, AP English Literature and Composition, AP Russian, AP Psychology, AP Biology, and AP Statistics. Most of these are only primarily offered to juniors and seniors.

Each year over 90% of the Senior class studies for a year or two in yeshivas in Israel before beginning college.

The Jewish Educational Center uses the Arrowsmith Program.

Administration 

Rabbi Elazar Mayer Teitz - Dean
Rabbi Ami Neuman - Principal (RTMA-JEC Highschool)
Rabbi Noach Sauber - Assistant Principal (RTMA-JEC Highschool)
Rabbi Uzi Beer - Principal (JEC Lower School, RTMA-JEC Middle School)
Mrs. Esther Eisenman - Principal (Bruriah)
Shlomis Peikes - Associate Principal (Bruriah)
Sherry Krupka - Assistant Principal (Bruriah)

Extracurricular activities

Athletics
JEC has been a member of the Yeshiva League since the league's inception in 1979.
JEC teams include:

JJV - Middle School
Basketball
Hockey

JV - High School
JV Basketball
JV Hockey
JV Softball

Varsity - High School
Varsity Wrestling
Varsity Basketball
Varsity Hockey
Varsity Softball
Varsity Baseball
Varsity Volleyball

All High School
Soccer
Tennis
Swim

Academic teams
Gildor Team (3 time semi-final winners)
Debate
Mock Trial
JV College Bowl
Varsity College Bowl
JV Torah Bowl
Varsity Torah Bowl
NJ Challenge
Chess
Model UN

Clubs
Israel Advocacy
Cooking
CPR/First Aid
Medical Research
Gildor
Unconventional Halacha
Study Hall
Meaningful Movies
Politics
Workout 
Parsha
Fantasy Football Prep.
Art

Community 
The JEC community consists of five synagogues, as well as many other services for the Jewish community of the Elizabeth-Hillside area.

Synagogues
Elmora Avenue Shul
Adath Israel
Beis Yitzchak
Adath Jeshurun
Elmora Hills Minyan

References

External links
School web site

1940 establishments in New Jersey
Education in Elizabeth, New Jersey
Educational institutions established in 1940
Jewish day schools in New Jersey
Private elementary schools in New Jersey
Private high schools in Union County, New Jersey
Private middle schools in New Jersey
Orthodox yeshivas in New Jersey
Modern Orthodox Jewish day schools in the United States
Modern Orthodox Judaism in New Jersey